Alexei Chupin (born November 11, 1972) is a Soviet and a Russian former professional ice hockey forward, who played for the Russia in WC 1997 and WC 1998. He is a three-time Russian Champion

Awards and honors

References

External links
Biographical information and career statistics from Eliteprospects.com, or The Internet Hockey Database

1972 births
Living people
HC Izhstal players
Ak Bars Kazan players
HC Dynamo Moscow players
HC MVD players
Metallurg Novokuznetsk players
Russian ice hockey forwards